Senator Vose may refer to:

Richard H. Vose (1803–1864), Maine State Senate
Roger Vose (1763–1841), New Hampshire State Senate